The William Allman Memorial Arena, originally Stratford Arena, is an ice hockey arena in Stratford, Ontario. This arena is home to the Stratford Warriors (Formerly the Stratford Cullitons).

The arena has been used by numerous film and television crews, also in Bauer's "Leave an Impression" advertising campaign. 

Many NHLers began their Junior hockey career in Stratford with the Junior B Stratford Cullitons (who have moved back to their original name 'Stratford Warriors' in 2016).   

A portrait of Queen Elizabeth II hangs at one end of the rink.

External links
 - Stratford Cullitons Alumni
William Allman Memorial Arena - The OHL Arena & Travel Guide
Photo Album - William Allman Memorial Arena
Beacon Herald - The Beacon Herald news
 - The Beacon Herald news

Indoor arenas in Ontario
Indoor ice hockey venues in Canada
Ontario Hockey League arenas
Sports venues in Ontario
Sport in Stratford, Ontario
Buildings and structures completed in 1924
Buildings and structures in Stratford, Ontario